Jeremiah "Jerry" Alvin Jones (March 30, 1858 - November 23, 1950) was a Black Canadian soldier who served in World War I. He was recommended for a Distinguished Conduct Medal but there is no record of him having received it. His treatment has been seen as an example of the lack of recognition accorded to Black Canadian soldiers. Campaigns to have him receive the medal posthumously eventually resulted in his being awarded the Canadian Forces Medallion for Distinguished Service on February 22, 2010.

Military service
Jones enlisted as a private with the 106th Battalion (Nova Scotia Rifles), CEF on June 19, 1916, in Truro, Nova Scotia. He had to lie about his age saying his birthday was on March 29, 1877, which would have made him 39 instead of his real age 58. 716221 Private Jeremiah (Jerry) Jones served in France with The Royal Canadian Regiment. He joined the regiment in the field on 9 Feb 1917 and was evacuated (wounded) to England on 12 April 1917.

During the Battle of Vimy Ridge in World War I, Canadian troops were pinned down by German machine gun fire. Jones volunteered to attack a German gun emplacement. He managed to reach the machine gun nest, tossed a hand grenade and killed several soldiers. The remainder surrendered to him and Jones forced his captives to carry the machine gun back across the battlefield to the Canadian lines, where they were ordered to deposit it at his commanding officer's feet. For his heroics, Private Jones was reportedly recommended for a Distinguished Conduct Medal (DCM) which he was never awarded.

Jones never actually received the DCM, although it was widely reported at the time that he was recommended for it by his commanding officer. Several veterans have since supported the claim that Jones was to be awarded the DCM, but no records have surfaced to prove that he ever received it.

Campaigns for recognition
Over the years, The Truro Daily News has published several articles highlighting Jones' heroics on the battlefield and his recommendation for the DCM. A letter from a Truro soldier based in Witley Camp, Surrey, England on July 29, 1917, that was published in the Truro Daily News, quoted the writer as saying, Jones, "had captured a German machine gun, forced the crew to carry it back to our lines, and, depositing it at the feet of the CO. said;- 'Is this thing any good?'"

On September 21, 1917, Jones's sister Martha told The Truro Daily News said that Jones "won the DCM by capturing a German machine gun and crew".  The newspaper once again alluded to the medal recommendation, in an article on Jerry's 79th birthday.  This time they reported "His valor won for him a recommendation for the DCM"

For most of his adult life, Senator Calvin Ruck lobbied to get the Canadian government to award a medal posthumously to Jerry Jones. Senator Ruck argued that the racist climate of the time precluded Jones or other black soldiers from getting their due recognition, and he felt that it would be appropriate for the government to award the medal to Jones on behalf of all black veterans. Senator Ruck died in 2004, without achieving success.

Posthumous recognition
On September 9, 2000, The Last Post Fund erected a new grave stone for Jones with full military honours. The Truro Millennium Committee, 125th Anniversary Committee and The Jones Family sponsored a tree carving of Jones as part of the Truro Tree Sculpture Project, in November 2000.

The Canadian Government finally recognized Jeremiah "Jerry" Jones, posthumously, on February 22, 2010, with the awarding of the Canadian Forces Medallion for Distinguished Service. Rear Admiral Paul Maddison, Commander, Maritime Forces Atlantic/Joint Task Force Atlantic, said "Today, on behalf of General Walter Natynczyk, Chief of the Defence Staff, I feel extremely privileged to finally acknowledge the gallantry of private Jeremiah Jones on the hills of Vimy Ridge in 1917 during the First World War."

Personal

Jeremiah married Ethel Edna Geraldine Cook from Amherst, Nova Scotia on March 30, 1898. They remained married until her death on February 12, 1940. The couple had 9 children. Jeremiah's grandson was the well-known Nova Scotia activist Rocky Jones (from his son Elmer Alvin Jones).

See also
Military history of Nova Scotia

Bibliography
Notes
 
References

Further reading
 Ruck, Calvin. Canada's Black Battalion: No. 2 Construction, 1916-1920
 Ruck, Calvin. The Black Battalion : 1916-1920 : Canada's best kept military secret
 Freeman-Shaw, Haskings-Winner. Canadian Sources: Investigated-1914 to the Present (ISBN/)
 Marble, Alan Everett. Nova Scotians at Home and Abroad. Lancelot Press, 1977

External links
Biography on Radio Canada International website

1858 births
1950 deaths
Black Nova Scotians
Canadian Expeditionary Force soldiers
People from Truro, Nova Scotia